Viento salvaje (English: "Wild Wind") is a 1974 Mexican Western drama film directed by Zacarías Gómez Urquiza. It stars Eric del Castillo, Regina Torné, Víctor Junco, and Rosalba Brambila.

Plot
Bandits rob a church and kidnap María (Brambila). Though the parish priest manages to accidentally kill one of bandits, the two surviving bandits, Sam (Víctor Junco) and Brazos (Tito Junco), rape Maria before selling her into sexual slavery at a brothel. There, the prostitute Verónica (Torné) instructs her in her trade.

Cast
 Eric del Castillo as Father Sierra
 Regina Torné as Verónica
 Víctor Junco as Sam
 Rosalba Brambila as María
 Federico Falcón as Pájaro azul
 Lina Montes as Pedro's wife
 Raúl Pérez Prieto
 Araceli Laiseka (as Aracely Layseka)
 Ángel Di Stefani as Father Damián (as Angel De Stefani)
 Tamara Garina as Veronica's Assistant
 Regino Herrera as Matias
 Rina Valdarno
 Jacquelin Junco
 Fernando Pinkus as Ricardo
 Jesús Gómez as Deputy
 Leonor Gómez as Old lady in church
 Víctor Jordán
 Nicolás Jasso
 Marcelo Villamil as Sherriff
 Eduardo Quintana
 Rubén Márquez as Pedro
 José Chávez
 Tito Junco as Brazos
 Gerardo Zepeda as Man in Canteen (uncredited)

References

Bibliography
García Riera, Emilio. Historia documental del cine mexicano: 1972–1973. University of Guadalajara, 1992.

External links

1974 Western (genre) films
Films directed by Zacarías Gómez Urquiza
Mexican Western (genre) films
1974 drama films
1974 films
1970s Spanish-language films
1970s Mexican films
Mexican drama films